The men's club throw at the 2018 World Para Athletics European Championships was held at the Friedrich-Ludwig-Jahn-Sportpark in Berlin from 20 to 26 August. Two classification finals are held in all over this event.

Medalists

See also
List of IPC world records in athletics

References

See also
List of IPC world records in athletics

Club throw
2018 in men's athletics
Club throw at the World Para Athletics European Championships